The Fernand Collin Prize for Law (Dutch: Fernand Collin-prijs voor Recht) was named after Fernand Collin. It is awarded to a scientist who makes a significant Dutch-language contribution to law in Belgium. In 1972 it was awarded to an economist.

Awards
 1962 - Walter Van Gerven (Katholieke Universiteit Leuven): Het toegeven van premies in het Klein Europees handelsverkeer
 1972 - Willy van Ryckeghem (Vrije Universiteit Brussel and Ghent University): Een econometrische studie van het dynamisch verband tussen inflatie en werkloosheid: een internationale vergelijking
 1982 - Marc Maresceau (Ghent University): De directe werking van het Europees gemeenschapsrecht
 1984 - Koenraad Lenaerts (Katholieke Universiteit Leuven): Constitutie en rechter. De rechtspraak van het Amerikaanse Opperste Gerechtshof, het Europese Hof van Justitie en het Europese Hof voor de Rechten van de Mens
 1986 - Michel Flamee (Vrije Universiteit Brussel): Octrooieerbaarheid van software. Rechtsvergelijkende studie : België, Nederland, Frankrijk, Bondsrepubliek Duitsland, Groot-Brittannië, de Verenigde Staten van Noord-Amerika en het Europees octrooiverdrag
 1988 - Aloïs Van Oevelen (University of Antwerp): De overheidsaansprakelijkheid voor het optreden van de rechterlijke macht
 1990 - Jan Velaers: (University of Antwerp): De juridische vormgeving van de beperkingen van de vrijheid van meningsuiting
 1992 - Thierry Vansweevelt (University of Antwerp): De civielrechtelijke aansprakelijkheid van de geneesheer en het ziekenhuis
 1994 - Sophie Stijns (Katholieke Universiteit Leuven): De gerechtelijke en buitengerechtelijke ontbinding van wederkerige overeenkomsten naar Belgisch recht, getoetst aan het Franse en het Nederlandse recht
 1996 - Piet Taelman (Ghent University): Het gezag van het rechterlijk gewijzigde in het gerechtelijk recht - begripsbepaling en -afbakening
 1998 - Patricia Popelier (University of Antwerp): Rechtszekerheid als beginsel voor behoorlijke regelgeving
 2000 - Piet Van Nuffel (Katholieke Universiteit Leuven): De rechten van nationale overheden in het Europees recht
 2000 - Annelies Wylleman ((Ghent University): Onvolwaardige wilsvorming en onbekwaamheid in het materieel en het formeel privaatrecht
 2002 - Erik Claes (Katholieke Universiteit Leuven): Legaliteit en rechtsvinding in het strafrecht. Een grondslagentheoreische benadering
 2004 - Johan Du Mongh (Katholieke Universiteit Leuven): De erfovergang van aandelen
 2004 - Britt Weyts (University of Antwerp): De fout van het slachtoffer in het buitencontractueel aansprakelijkheidsrecht
 2006 - Steven Lierman (University of Antwerp): Voorzorg, preventie en aansprakelijkheid. Gezondheidsrechtelijke analyse aan de hand van het gebruik van ioniserende straling in de geneeskunde.
 2010 - Ingrid Boone (Ghent University): Verhaal van derde-betalers op de aansprakelijke
 2012 - Jürgen Vanpraet (University of Antwerp): De latente staatshervorming. De bevoegdheidsverdeling in de rechtspraak van het Grondwettelijk Hof en de adviespraktijk van de Raad van State 
 2014 - Tom Decaigny (Vrije Universiteit Brussel): Tegenspraak in het vooronderzoek. Een onderzoek naar de meerwaarde van een vroege participatie van de verdachte in de Belgische strafprocedure 
 2016 - Sofie Cools (Katholieke Universiteit Leuven): De bevoegdheidsverdeling tussen algemene vergadering en raad van bestuur in de NV 
 2018 - Joost Huysmans (Katholieke Universiteit Leuven): Legitieme verdediging
 2020 - Tim Opgenhaffen (Katholieke Universiteit Leuven): Vrijheidsbeperkingen in de zorg
 2022 - Janek Tomasz Nowak (Katholieke Universiteit Leuven): Ambtshalve toepassing van EU-recht door de Belgische burgerlijke rechter

Sources
 Fernand Collin-prijs voor Recht

Legal awards
Belgian awards